Ed Burlingham (born October 14, 1951) is a former American rugby union player who played as a lock. He was president of Back Bay RFC.

Career
Burlingham started his rugby career in 1974 at Irvine Coast RFC in Newport Beach, California following a successful four years of college basketball at the University of California, Irvine. He worked his way quickly through Southern California and Pacific Coast Grizzly selections leading up to the awarding of his first cap against the New Zealand All Blacks in 1980.

Ed went on to earn 14 caps for the US National Team and captained the Eagles during the first Rugby World Cup in 1987.  He captained the Eagles during his 7-year campaign with the USA Rugby team in games against Canada, England, South Africa, Japan and the 1983 tour of Australia.  Ed was also named to the prestigious North American Barbarians team to tour South Africa in 1982.

Burlingham has been active with USA Rugby since his playing days ended and was named Assistant Coach of the 1991 Eagle Rugby World Cup squad.  He is now involved with Back Bay RFC in his hometown of Newport Beach and has served as Club President and Head Coach as well as assisting with many other club responsibilities.

Burlingham was inducted to the USAR Hall of Fame in 2015 and is a life member of Back Bay Rugby.

Notes

External links

1951 births
Living people
American rugby union players
Rugby union locks
United States international rugby union players
UC Irvine Anteaters men's basketball players
Sportspeople from Newport Beach, California
American men's basketball players